The Chincoteague pony, also known as the Assateague horse, is a breed of horse that developed and lives in a feral condition on Assateague Island in the states of Virginia and Maryland as one of the many breeds of feral horses in the United States. The breed was made famous by the Misty of Chincoteague series of novels written by Marguerite Henry starting in 1947. While phenotypically horse-like, they are commonly called "ponies". This is due in part to their smaller stature, a result of the poor habitat on Assateague Island. Variation is found in their physical characteristics due to blood from different breeds being introduced at various points in their history. They can be any solid color and are often found in pinto patterns, which are a favorite with breed enthusiasts. Island Chincoteagues live on a diet of salt marsh plants and brush. This poor-quality and often scarce food combined with uncontrolled inbreeding created a propensity for conformation faults in the Chincoteague before outside blood was added beginning in the early 20th century.

Several legends are told regarding the origins of the Chincoteague ponies; the most popular holds that they descend from survivors of wrecked Spanish galleons off the Virginia coast. Another theory is that they descend from stock released on the island by 17th-century colonists looking to escape livestock laws and taxes on the mainland. In 1835, the practice of pony penning began, with residents rounding up ponies and removing some of them to the mainland. In 1924 the first official "Pony Penning Day" was held by the Chincoteague Volunteer Fire Company, where ponies were auctioned as a way to raise money for fire equipment. The annual event has continued in the same fashion almost uninterrupted to the present day.

Although popularly known as Chincoteague ponies, the feral ponies live on Assateague Island.  The entire island is owned by the federal government and is split by a fence at the Maryland/Virginia state line, with a herd of around 150 ponies living on the Virginia side of the fence, and 80 on the Maryland side. The herds live on land managed by two different federal agencies with very different management strategies. Ponies from the Maryland herd, referred to in the literature of the National Park Service as Assateague horses, live within Assateague Island National Seashore. They are generally treated as wild animals, given no more or less assistance than other species on the island, other than to be treated with contraceptives to prevent overpopulation.   Conversely, the Virginia herd, referred to as Chincoteague ponies, lives within the Chincoteague National Wildlife Refuge but is owned by the Chincoteague Volunteer Fire Company. The Virginia ponies are treated to twice yearly veterinary inspections, which prepare them for life among the general equine population if they are sold at auction. While only around 300 ponies live on Assateague Island, around 1,000 more live off-island, having been purchased or bred by private breeders.

The Chincoteague Pony was added to the Code of Virginia § 1-510 (Official emblems and designations) as the designated pony of Virginia by the General Assembly of the Commonweath of Virginia in February 2023.

Characteristics

While phenotypically horses, the Chincoteague is most often referred to as a pony breed. All solid colors are found in the breed, as are pinto patterns. Horses with pinto coloration tend to sell for the most money at the annual auction. Due to outside bloodlines being added to the Chincoteague herd, there is some variation in physical characteristics. In general, the breed tends to have a straight or slightly concave facial profile with a broad forehead and refined throatlatch and neck. The shoulders are well angled, the ribs well sprung, the chest broad and the back short with broad loins. The croup is rounded, with a thick, low-set tail. The breed's legs tend to be straight, with good, dense bone that makes them sound and sturdy. Domesticated Chincoteagues are considered intelligent and willing to please. They are viewed as easy to train, and are used as hunter, driving and trail ponies. In terms of health, they are generally hardy and easy keepers (able to live on little food).

History
Legend states that Chincoteague ponies descend from Spanish horses shipwrecked off the Virginia coast on their way to Peru in the 16th century. Another story holds that they descend from horses left on the island by pirates. Other evidence points to their ancestors actually being horses brought to the islands in the 17th century by mainland farmers.  Livestock on the islands were not subject to taxes or fencing laws, and so many animals, including hogs, sheep, cattle and horses, were brought to the islands. While the National Park Service holds to the theory that the horses were brought to the island in the 17th century, the Chincoteague Volunteer Fire Company, which owns the ponies on the Virginia side of Assateague, argues that the Spanish shipwreck theory is correct. They argue that horses were too valuable in the 17th century to have been left to run wild on the island, and claim that there are two sunken Spanish galleons off the Virginia coast in support of their theory. The National Chincoteague Pony Association also promotes the shipwreck theory. In the early 1900s, they were described as having been on the islands since well before the American Revolution, and were described at that time as "very diminutive, but many of them are of perfect symmetry and extraordinary powers of action and endurance." In the early 1800s, Virginia governor Henry A. Wise released what one author called the "earliest printed testimony" on the Chincoteague.

During the 1920s, before the herds were managed by various agencies, many conformation faults were found—the effects of uncontrolled inbreeding. Misshapen legs, narrow chests, poor bone and a lack of substance plagued the breed, with many stunted animals not growing above . This was partially due to the limited and poor-quality feed found on the islands, although this harsh habitat also allowed only the hardiest and most adaptable ponies to survive. Welsh and Shetland pony blood was added to upgrade the stock, and horses with pinto coloring were introduced to give the herd its common distinctive patterns and contribute to the more horse-like phenotype of the breed. Twenty Mustangs owned by the Bureau of Land Management were introduced in 1939.  Arabian blood was added in the hopes of adding refinement and height to the breed, as well as increasing the length of their legs.  Arabian stallions were used at two different points within the breed history: one was released with the herd, but did not survive, while another was bred to mares that had been removed from the island for breeding and then returned once in foal. The Chincoteague pony has a similar history to the Shackleford Banker Horse, which comes from the Shackleford Banks off the coast of North Carolina. However, the Shackleford is a more isolated population, with no outside blood added to the island herd.

The island itself has also undergone change. At one time, the island was connected to the lowest point of Fenwick Island. In August 1933, a hurricane created an inlet south of Ocean City, Maryland, separating the two landforms. After the storm, between 1933 and 1935, a permanent system of artificial jetties was built to preserve the inlet as a navigation channel.

Pony penning

In 1835, the first written description of "pony penning" (roundup) appeared, though the practice of rounding up livestock on the island existed for many years before that. Initially, unclaimed animals were marked for ownership by groups of settlers. By 1885, the event had become a festival day, and two days of horse and sheep roundups were held on Assateague and Chincoteague Islands. While the sheep population diminished over time, the pony population grew. In 1909, the last Wednesday and Thursday of July were designated as the annual days for pony penning, still taking place on both Assateague and Chincoteague Islands. However, in the early 1920s, much of Assateague Island was purchased by a wealthy farmer, forcing many settlers to move to Chincoteague Island and necessitating a change in the pony penning format. By 1923, all parts of pony penning except for the actual roundup had moved to Chincoteague Island, with the ponies being transported by truck for the first two years before the annual swim was begun. By the early 1900s, Chincoteague Island had been established as a tourism and sport haven, and in 1922, a causeway was completed that connected the island to the Virginia mainland. After a pair of fires ravaged Chincoteague Island that same year, the Chincoteague Volunteer Fire Company was established. In 1924, the first official Pony Penning Day was held, where the foals were auctioned at $25–50 each to raise money for fire equipment. Pony Penning Day has been held annually ever since, with the exception of 1942, 1943, and 2020.

Currently as many as 50,000 visitors gather on the last Wednesday in July to watch mounted riders bring the Virginia herd from Assateague and swim them across the channel to Chincoteague Island. The swim takes five to ten minutes, with both the rider and the observers on hand to assist horses, especially foals, who may have a hard time with the crossing. Before the swim, the herd is evaluated and mares in the late stages of pregnancy and those with very young foals are removed from the herd to be trailered between the islands. During the swim, some lactating mares become affected with hypocalcemia, which is treated by on-site veterinarians. Larger foals are auctioned the next day and the majority of the herd, including any young foals, are returned to Assateague on Friday. As of 2015, the highest price paid for a pony was $25,000 and the lowest price was $500. Some ponies are purchased under "buy back" conditions, where the bidder donates the money to the fire department but allows the pony to be released back onto Assateague Island.

Breed registry and preservation
The National Chincoteague Pony Association (NCPA) was founded in 1985 and the International Chincoteague Pony Association and Registry (ICPAR) was founded in 2021. The associations maintain a studbook and register ponies from the annual fire company auction and ponies from private breeders. The ICPAR registrars half Chincoteague Ponies from private breeders. The Chincoteague Pony Association (CPA) was founded by the Chincoteague Volunteer Fire Company in 1994 and closed in 2012. Many ponies are registered with multiple associations. There are more than 1,000 Chincoteague ponies owned by private individuals off Chincoteague Island, spread throughout the US and Canada.

Management

All of Chincoteague Island lies within Virginia state lines, while Assateague Island is split between two states—a larger northern portion in Maryland and the smaller southern section within Virginia. Two separate herds of ponies live on Assateague Island, separated by a fence that runs along the Maryland-Virginia state border.  Though descended from the same original stock, the Maryland feral ponies are called "Assateague horses" and are maintained by the National Park Service. The Virginia feral ponies are called "Chincoteague ponies" and are owned by Chincoteague Volunteer Fire Department.  In 1943, the entire island was purchased by the federal government and divided into two protected areas, Assateague Island National Seashore in Maryland and Chincoteague National Wildlife Refuge in Virginia. The two herds lie under the jurisdiction of different governmental agencies, and different management strategies have been applied to each herd. The Maryland section of Assateague also contains Assateague State Park, state-owned land where the ponies are allowed to roam, although the state plays little or no part in their management.

The feral ponies in both herds separate themselves into small bands, with most consisting of a stallion, several mares and their foals.  Ponies on Assateague have a diet that consists mainly of cordgrass, a coarse grass that grows in salt marshes, which makes up around 80 percent of their food. This diet is supplemented by other vegetation such as rose hips, bayberry, greenbriar, American beach grass, seaweed and poison ivy. Chincoteague ponies require up to twice as much water as most horses require due to the saltiness of their diet. The increased amount of water that they drink contributes to many ponies appearing to be bloated or fat.

Maryland herd

The Maryland herd, often called the Assateague herd, is owned and managed by the National Park Service. Its presence on a relatively small and naturally confined area has made it ideal for scientific study. Since the late 1970s, scientists have used the herd to conduct studies on feral horse behavior, social structure, ecology, remote contraceptive delivery and pregnancy testing, and the effects of human intervention on other wild animal populations. There are few other wildlife populations of any species worldwide that have been studied in as much detail over as long a period as the Maryland herd of Chincoteague ponies.

Herd numbers grew from 28 to over 165 between 1968 and 1997 and overgrazing negatively impacted their living environment. To manage population numbers, long-term, non-hormonal contraceptives have been employed, proving 95 percent effective over a seven-year field trial. The contraceptive, which began to be used at a management level in 1995 although it was used in smaller amounts as early as 1989, has also proven effective at improving the health and increasing the life expectancy of older mares through the removal of pregnancy and lactation-related stress. Since 1990, general herd health has improved, early mortality has decreased and older ponies are now found, with many over the age of 20 and some even over 25. No horse has ever been injured during the dart-administered treatments, although there is a 0.2 percent rate of abscess at the injection site, which normally heals within two weeks. Each mare between two and four years old is given contraceptives, and treatment is then withdrawn until she produces a foal. Once she has produced enough foals to be well represented genetically within the herd, she is placed on a yearly treatment plan until her death. After the introduction of the contraceptive, herd numbers continued to rise to a high of 175 in 2001 to 2005, but then dropped significantly to around 130 in 2009. In 2009, a study determined that mitochondrial DNA diversity in the herd was quite low, most likely due to their isolation, but that their nuclear genetic diversity remained at a level similar to that of breeds from the mainland.

Other than the contraceptive and treatment in emergencies, ponies from the Maryland herd are treated much like other wildlife, with no extra attention paid to them by Park Service employees. It is thought likely that the Maryland herd carries equine infectious anemia (EIA); they are effectively quarantined, however, by allowing no riding or camping with privately owned horses along the mainland shore during the insect season which stretches from mid-May to October. Due to their treatment as wild animals, ponies from the Maryland herd can be aggressive, and there have been reports of them tearing down tents and biting, kicking and knocking down visitors. In 2010, after an increase in biting incidents, the National Park Service implemented new measures for educating visitors about the ponies. These measures included new safety information in brochures and recommended viewing distances between the visitors and the ponies. There is also some danger to the ponies from the visitors: ponies have become ill from being fed inappropriate human foods, and on average one Maryland pony a year is killed by a car. Since 1991 there has been a "Pony Patrol", where volunteers on bikes patrol the island, educating visitors about the ponies.

Virginia herd
The Virginia herd, often called the Chincoteague herd, is owned and managed by the Chincoteague Volunteer Fire Company. The US Fish and Wildlife Service (FWS) allows the ponies to live on Assateague under a special use grazing permit, allowing approximately 150 adult ponies in the Chincoteague National Wildlife Refuge.

60 to approximately 70 foals are born into the Chincoteague herd each year. The annual Pony Pennings are used to maintain the herd size at around 150 animals. Since 1943, the FWS has been working on the island to protect and increase the wildfowl population, and their efforts have sometimes endangered the Chincoteague herd. Due to the placement of fences by the FWS, a reduced amount of land is available for grazing by the ponies. The fencing also prevents them from reaching the sea, where they often went to escape biting insects, including mosquitos.  In 1962, several ponies were trapped in an enclosure by high water and died when they were carried out to sea during a storm. Unlike the Maryland herd, ponies on the Virginia side of the island are fenced off from roadways to prevent auto accidents and to discourage visitors from feeding the ponies.

In the late 20th century, some ponies previously sold at auction were returned to Assateague Island when population numbers threatened to drop below the targeted numbers due to large numbers of deaths from storms or other issues. Since 1990, the ponies from the Virginia herd have been rounded up biannually for veterinary treatment, including deworming and vaccinations for diseases such as rabies, tetanus and Eastern and Western encephalitis, although they make the swim to Chincoteague only once per year. In addition, continual monitoring and basic first aid for any minor injuries is performed by a committee from the fire department.  Such intervention is needed because many of the ponies will be brought into the general horse population through the auction and purchase by private buyers. During the veterinary visits, they are also tested for EIA.

Books

In 1947, Marguerite Henry released the children's book Misty of Chincoteague, the first in a series of novels that made the Chincoteague breed internationally famous. The real Misty was foaled on Chincoteague Island in 1946, and was purchased as a weanling by Henry. In 1961, the publicity was increased even more when the film Misty was made, based on the book. The publicity generated by the books assisted the Chincoteague Fire Department and the breed in remaining viable into the 21st century. While fictionalized, the books were based on a real horse and ranch on Chincoteague Island. The Misty of Chincoteague Foundation was established in 1990 to preserve the Beebe Ranch and establish a museum with memorabilia from the series.

Notes

References

External links

 National Chincoteague Pony Association
 International Chincoteague Pony Association and Registry
 Chincoteague Volunteer Fire Company
 Chincoteague Pony Pedigree Database
 Chincoteague Pony Centre

Assateague Island
Horse breeds originating in the United States
Feral horses
Horse breeds
Tourist attractions in Accomack County, Virginia
Tourist attractions in Worcester County, Maryland
Chincoteague, Virginia